GCTS may refer to:
 Gordon–Conwell Theological Seminary, in Hamilton, Massachusetts, United States
 Tenerife–South Airport, in the Canary Islands, Spain
 UN Global Counter-Terrorism Strategy

See also 
 GCT (disambiguation)